Maqsudabad (also Romanized as Maqşūdābād; also known as Maqşūdābād-e Tol-e Yāsūlī) is a village in Rudbal Rural District, in the Central District of Marvdasht County, Fars Province, Iran. At the 2006 census, its population was 65, in 20 families.

References 

Populated places in Marvdasht County